Icana may refer to:
Içana River, a river in South America
Icana News Agency, news agency in Iran